was a 120-metre-tall giant Ferris wheel in the city of Fukuoka, Japan, operating from December 2001 until September 2009.
It was located in the Evergreen Marinoa (Japanese: エバーグリーンマリノア) entertainment facility adjacent to the Marinoa City Fukuoka mall, which itself features a smaller, 58-metre-tall ferris wheel.

The gondolas were all air conditioned and accessible for wheelchair-users. One full rotation took approximately 20 minutes.

Sky Dream Fukuoka closed on 26 September 2009. It was subsequently sold to a Taiwanese company for rebuilding at Lihpao Land in Taiwan. Dismantling work commenced in 2010, although work was disrupted in July 2011 when supports failed, causing two cranes involved in dismantling to topple over, injuring one workman and damaging four cars.

References

External links
 
 

Ferris wheels in Japan
Former Ferris wheels
Buildings and structures in Fukuoka
Tourist attractions in Fukuoka